The 1964 Detroit Titans football team represented the University of Detroit as an independent during the 1964 NCAA University Division football season. In their third and final season under head coach John Idzik, the Titans played their home games on campus at University of Detroit Stadium, finished 3–7, and were outscored 158 to 127.

Basketball head coach Bob Calihan was named the school's athletic director in September 1964.  The football team's assistant coaches were Joe Clark, Dave Nusz, and Tony Hanley. Fullback Fred Beier was the team captain.

Discontinuance of football program
On November 30, nine days after the season ended with a road loss at Boston College, the university announced that the football program was being discontinued. The university's president, the Very Rev. Laurence V. Britt, SJ, noted that the football program had not made a profit since 1951, had operated at a deficit for years, and had lost $65,000 in 1964 – a figure critics said was a bookkeeping device attempting to estimate the loss of tuition from players receiving football scholarships. With limited resources and mounting academic costs, Father Britt stated that the university could not subsidize the program at the level demanded by alumni and students. The decision stunned players and angered alumni. A protest by students included the removal of the stadium's goalposts.

Schedule

Players
 Dennis Assenmacher, halfback
 Fred Beier, fullback/defensive back and captain
 Tom Beer, end/guard
 Ron Bishop, quarterback
 Joe D'Angelo, halfback
 Jerry Dudley, guard
 John Everly, end
 Dennis Hackett, fullback
 Mike Haggerty, tackle
 Mike Randall, halfback
 Tony Richardson, end
 Tony Rossi, center
 Tom Siedlaczek, halfback
 Dick Waring, quarterback

References

External links
 1964 University of Detroit football programs

Detroit
Detroit Titans football seasons
Detroit Titans football
Detroit Titans football